Tygers of Pan Tang is the self-titled eleventh studio album by British heavy metal band Tygers of Pan Tang, released on October 21, 2016. An official music video was made for "Only the Brave"

Reception
The album received generally positive reviews. One review of the album on AngryMetalGuy.com gave a positive review of the record, stating:

Track listing

Personnel 
Jacopo Meille – Vocals
Micky Crystal – Electric and Acoustic Guitars
Robb Weir – Electric Guitar
Gavin Gray – Bass Guitar
Craig Ellis – Drums and Percussion

Miscellaneous staff 
Roberto Toderico – Artwork, Layout
Rafael Melo – Photography
Keith Newhouse – Photography
Markus Hagner – Photography
Neil Reed – Photography
Harry Hess – Mastering
Søren Andersen – Mixing

References

Tygers of Pan Tang albums
2016 albums